is a Japanese footballer currently playing as a defender for Tiamo Hirakata. He plays as a full back, capable of operating on the right or left.

Career statistics

Club
.

Notes

References

External links

1999 births
Living people
Chuo University alumni
Japanese footballers
Association football defenders
Sagan Tosu players